Propulsive gait is a form of gait abnormality.


Presentation
Stiff, with head and neck bent.

Conditions associated with a propulsive gait
 Carbon monoxide poisoning
 Parkinson's disease
 Manganese Toxicity

References

Gait abnormalities